Moussa Sylla (born 15 June 1989) is an Ivorian professional footballer who plays as a defensive midfielder.

Career
Sylla began 2002 on youth side. In the spring of 2003 signed in Côte d'Ivoire with Ecole de Football Yéo Martial and was here a year later (2004) promoted into the first team. He left after 30 games in two years on professional level for EFYM in January 2005 to Royal Thai Army FC. Sylla was by Royal Thai Army named as Best foreign Player and signed than in February 2009 for Muangthong United, who won in his first season League Championship.

Honours

Club
Muangthong United
 Thai Premier League (1): 2009

References

http://us.soccerway.com/players/moussa-sylla/113791/

1989 births
Living people
Ivorian footballers
Association football midfielders
Moussa Sylla
Moussa Sylla
Moussa Sylla
Moussa Sylla
Moussa Sylla
Moussa Sylla
Moussa Sylla
Moussa Sylla
Ivorian expatriate footballers
Expatriate footballers in Thailand
Ivorian expatriate sportspeople in Thailand